Raphael Butler (born January 4, 1984) is an American retired Heavyweight boxer and mixed martial artist. A professional boxing competitor from 2004 until 2011, he fought fighters the likes of David Price, Malik Scott, Eddie Chambers, and Chris Arreola.

Boxing career

Amateur career
Butler had a stellar amateur career, winning the 2004 National Golden Gloves Super Heavyweight Championship. Butler represented the 4th Street Gym in his hometown of Rochester, Minnesota.

Professional career
Butler turned professional in 2004. He was seen as a future star in the sport early on, but suffered two TKO losses against journeyman fighters in 2005. In 2006 he took on ESPN house fighter Jason Gavern, and lost a decision. After the loss, Butler ran off a string of victories against marginal opposition before taking on Art Binkowski in a nationally televised showcase bout on ShoBox. Despite dropping Binkowski three times in the first round, Butler tired as the fight went on, and the referee stopped the fight with just 30 seconds left before the final bell, awarding Binkowski a TKO. After six more wins against lesser competition, Butler was knocked out in 6 rounds by contender "Fast" Eddie Chambers on June 20 in the Cayman Islands.

Mixed martial arts career

Early career
Butler made his professional MMA debut in 2010 and compiled an undefeated record of 5–0 before being signed by Bellator MMA.

Bellator MMA
Butler made his promotional debut on June 19, 2013, at Bellator 96 against Jeremiah O'Neal and won via first-round knockout.

Butler then won his next two fights under the Bellator banner before fighting Nick Rossborough to a draw at Bellator 119 on May 9, 2014.

Butler then faced Javy Ayala at Bellator 125 on September 19, 2014. Butler was handed his first professional loss via rear-naked choke submission in the first round.

Butler next fought Josh Diekmann at Bellator 134 on February 27, 2015. Butler won via a first-round standing guillotine choke submission.

Mixed martial arts record

|-
|Loss
| align=center|9–2–1
| Tony Johnson
| TKO (punches)
| Bellator 148
| 
| align=center|3
| align=center|4:24
| Fresno, California, United States
|
|-
|Win
|align=center|9–1–1
|Josh Diekmann
|Submission (standing guillotine)
|Bellator 134
|
|align=center|1
|align=center|1:04
|Uncasville, Connecticut, United States
|
|-
|Loss
|align=center|8–1–1
|Javy Ayala
|Submission (rear-naked choke)
|Bellator 125
|
|align=center|1
|align=center|1:03
|Fresno, California, United States
|
|-
|Draw
|align=center|8–0–1
|Nick Rossborough
|Draw (majority)
|Bellator 119
|
|align=center|3
|align=center|5:00
|Rama, Ontario, Canada
|
|-
|Win
|align=center|8–0
|Josh Burns
|TKO (retirement)
|Bellator 107
|
|align=center| 1
|align=center| 2:14
|Thackerville, Oklahoma, United States
|
|-
|Win
|align=center|7–0
|Joseph Bryant
|TKO (strikes)
|Bellator 105
|
|align=center| 1
|align=center| 1:04
|Rio Rancho, New Mexico, United States
|
|-
|Win
|align=center|6–0
|Jeremiah O'Neal
|KO (punches)
|Bellator 96
|
|align=center| 1
|align=center| 2:19
|Thackerville, Oklahoma, United States
| 
|-
|Win
|align=center|5–0
|Brett Murphy
|KO (punch)
|Driller Promotions/ SEG: Throwdown at the Crowne 1
|
|align=center| 1
|align=center| 0:13
|St. Paul, Minnesota, United States
| Won the Minnesota Heavyweight Championship.
|-
|Win
|align=center|4–0
|Steven Shaw
|Submission (armbar)
|Brutaal Fight Night: Violent Night
|
|align=center| 1
|align=center| 4:35
|Maplewood, Minnesota, United States
| 
|-
|Win
|align=center|3–0
|Richard White
|Submission (punches)
|Brutaal Fight Night: Rochester
|
|align=center| 2
|align=center| 3:18
|Rochester, Minnesota, United States
| 
|-
|Win
|align=center|2–0
|Jeremy Beck
|KO (punches)
|Brutaal: Fight Night
|
|align=center| 1
|align=center| 3:36
|Red Wing, Minnesota, United States
| 
|-
|Win
|align=center|1–0
|Gabe Hobbs
|KO (punch)
|Brutaal: Fight Night
|
|align=center| 1
|align=center| 0:36
|Welch, Minnesota, United States
|

Professional boxing record

See also
 List of Bellator MMA alumni
 List of mixed martial artists with professional boxing records

References

External links
 
 

1984 births
Living people
Heavyweight boxers
Boxers from Minnesota
National Golden Gloves champions
American male boxers
Sportspeople from Rochester, Minnesota